Abd al-Rahman ibn Abd Allah Al-Ghafiqi (died 732), was an Arab Umayyad commander of the Andalusian Muslims that he unsuccessfully led into battle against the forces of Charles Martel in the Battle of Tours on October 10, 732 AD.

Early years
From the Arab Tihamite tribe of Ghafiq, he relocated to Ifriqiya (now Tunisia), then to the stretch of the Maghreb that is now Algeria, Morocco, Tunisia and Mauritania, where he became acquainted with Musa ibn Nusayr and his son Abd al-Aziz, the governors of al-Andalus.

Battle of Toulouse
Abd Al-Rahman took part in the Battle of Toulouse, where Al Samh ibn Malik was killed in 721 (102 A.H.) by the forces of Duke Odo of Aquitaine. After the severe defeat, he fled south along with other commanders and troops, and took over the command of Eastern Andalus. He was briefly relieved of his command, when Anbasa ibn Suhaym al-Kalbi was appointed in 721 (103 AH). After Anbasa died in 726 (107 AH) in southern Gaul, several successive commanders were put in place, none of whom lasted very long.

Rebellion in Cerdanya
In 730 (112 AH), the Caliph Hisham ibn Abd al-Malik appointed Abd Al-Rahman as wali (governor/commander) of Al Andalus. David Levering Lewis describes him as "intelligent, eloquent, and an accomplished administrator". On hearing that Uthman ibn Naissa, the Berber deputy governor of Catalunya, had concluded an alliance with duke Odo of Aquitaine, in order to set up an independent Catalunya for himself, the governor hurried to quell the rebellion. He engaged the Berber lord's forces and killed him (731). (By some accounts, Uthman ibn Naissa killed himself.)

Battle of Garonne

The wali assembled troops in Pamplona, called for recruits from Yemen and the Levant, and prepared to cross the Pyrenees into Gaul. Many arrived, and he crossed the Pyrenees range with an army composed primarily of Arabs. Emir Abd Al-Rahman made his way through Gascony and Aquitaine, according to one unidentified Arab, "That army went through all places like a desolating storm," sacking and capturing the city of Bordeaux, after defeating Duke Odo of Aquitaine in battle outside the city, and then again defeating a second army of Duke Odo at the Battle of the River Garonne —where the western chroniclers state, "God alone knows the number of the slain."
 Unlike Toulouse, where Odo had won by achieving complete surprise over the Muslim forces when he relieved the city in 721, this time his forces were forced to face the Muslim cavalry in open battle and were utterly destroyed. Also, the Muslim forces he had faced at the Battle of Toulouse were primarily light infantry and, while good fighters, were not remotely close to the caliber of the Arab cavalry brought by the Emir in this invasion.

Battle of Tours-Poitiers

Odo, with his remaining nobility, fled to Charles Martel, seeking help. Charles was campaigning on the Danube when news reached him. Martel had a seasoned professional infantry which had campaigned with him for many years and force-marched his army towards Acquitaine. In addition to the levies of militia the Franks normally called up to buttress their forces,<ref name=Davis>Davis, Paul K. “100 Decisive Battles: From Ancient Times to the Present</ref> he formed an army of Gauls and Germans approximately 30,000 strong. The invading forces, having no reason to believe the Franks were anything more than one of the various barbarian tribes that had ravaged Europe after Rome's fall, failed to scout their strength in advance. They also misjudged Charles Martel, who was determined to prevent the expansion of the Caliphate over the Pyrenees into the heart of Christian Europe. This was a disastrous mistake which led to the defeat of Abd Al-Rahman in 732 (114 AH) near Poitiers, south of the river Loire.

The Frankish leader chose the battlefield. Moving his army over the mountains and avoiding the open roads, he escaped detection until positioning his men on a high, wooded plain. Martel had carefully chosen the battlefield, in large part knowing the hills and trees surrounding his position would greatly hinder the Muslim cavalry. For seven days, the two armies skirmished and maneuvered, with the Islamic forces recalling all their raiding parties, so that on the seventh day, their army was at full strength. Martel also received some reinforcements, though most historians agree he was badly outnumbered during the battle. Martel trained his men to fight in a large square, similar to the ancient Greek phalanx formation, to withstand the Muslim heavy cavalry. The Franks held their defensive formation all day, and repulsed repeated charges by the Muslim heavy cavalry.

According to Lewis, the Muslim soldiers were accompanied by their families. Wives and concubines were among the casualties. Realizing their camp was being plundered, a large contingent of Abd Al-Rahman's forces broke off battle and returned to rescue their booty. Abd Al-Rahman was thus left exposed before the Frankish infantry and was killed in battle while attempting to rally his men. One reason for the defeat of the Muslim army was their preoccupation with war booty; another was the squabbles between various ethnic and tribal factions, which led to the surviving generals being unable to agree on a single commander to take Abd Al-Rahman's place. Political factions, racial and ethnic rivalries, and personality clashes arose following his death. The varied nationalities and ethnicities present in an army drawn from all over the Caliphate, and the surviving generals, bickered among themselves, unable to agree on a commander to lead them the following day. The inability to select anyone to lead certainly contributed to the wholesale retreat of an army that was still dangerous.

Aftermath
Arab historians unanimously praise Abd Al-Rahman as a just and able administrator and commander, and bestow on him the honor of being the best governor of Al-Andalus, where he did not take sides in the ethnic and tribal divisions that plagued Al-Andalus under other rulers. Evidence of his irreplaceability as a ruler was demonstrated in the aftermath of his death at the Battle of Tours. Without his leadership and guidance, the other commanders were unable even to agree on a commander to lead them back into battle the following morning. Therefore, the effect of the death of Abd Al-Rahman on both Islamic and world history was profound.

His son attempted another invasion of Gaul under the Caliph's instructions in 736, this time by sea. This naval invasion landed in Narbonne in 736 and moved at once to reinforce Muslim Arles and move inland. Charles again descended on the Provençal strongholds of the Muslims. In 736, he took Montfrin and Avignon, and Arles and Aix-en-Provence with the help of Liutprand, King of the Lombards. Nîmes, Agde and Béziers, held by Muslims since 725, also fell to him and their fortresses and probably the cities altogether were destroyed. He crushed one Muslim army at Arles, as that force sallied out of the city, and then took the city itself by a direct and frontal attack, and burned it to the ground to prevent its use again as a stronghold for Muslim expansion. He then moved swiftly and defeated a mighty host outside of Narbonne at the River Berre, but lacking siege machines was unable to take the city.

Notes

References
 Creasy Edward S., Fifteen Decisive Battles of the World From Marathon to Waterloo Medieval Sourcebook: Arabs, Franks, and the Battle of Tours, 732
 Watson, William E., "The Battle of Tours-Poitiers Revisited", Providence: Studies in Western Civilization, 2 (1993)

Further reading
 The New Century Book of Facts, King-Richardson Company, Springfield, Massachusetts, 1911
 "Early Andalusian Politics", by Richard Greydanus
 Edward Gibbon, The Decline and Fall of the Roman Empire, (New York, 1974), 6:16.
 Richard Hooker, "Civil War and the Umayyads"
 Tours, Poiters, from "Leaders and Battles Database" online.
 Robert W. Martin, "The Battle of Tours is still felt today", from about.com
 Santosuosso, Anthony, Barbarians, Marauders, and Infidels 
 Bennett, Bradsbury, Devries, Dickie and Jestice, Fighting Techniques of the Medieval World
 Reagan, Geoffry, The Guinness Book of Decisive Battles'', Canopy Books, NY (1992) 

Arab generals
Year of birth unknown
732 deaths
Medieval Arabs killed in battle
Umayyad governors of Al-Andalus
Generals of the Umayyad Caliphate
Al-Andalus military personnel
8th-century Arabs
8th-century people from the Umayyad Caliphate